Otamatea River may refer to two rivers in New Zealand:

 Otamatea River (Hawke's Bay), a tributary of the Rangataiki River
 Otamatea River (Northland) a long arm of the Kaipara Harbour

See also
 Otamatea, a suburb of Whanganui